Peter Reinhard Hansen (born June 15, 1968) is the Henry A. Latané Distinguished Professor of Economics at the University of North Carolina at Chapel Hill. He has previously taught at Brown University, Stanford Graduate School of Business, Stanford University, and the European University Institute.

Biography
Hansen was born in Sorø, Denmark, where he went to Sorø Akademi. He studied mathematics and economics at the University of Copenhagen (M.sc. 1995) under the supervision of Søren Johansen and from 1996 he studied economics University of California, San Diego (Ph.D. 2000) supervised by James D. Hamilton.

Hansen is known for his research on volatility, forecasting and cointegration, including the "test for superior predictive ability", which can be used to test whether a benchmark forecast is significantly outperformed by competing forecasts, the Model Confidence Set. He has, in collaboration with Ole E. Barndorff-Nielsen, Asger Lunde, and Neil Shephard, developed the realized kernel estimator that can estimate the quadratic variation in an environment with noisy high-frequency data, such as financial tick-by-tick data. He co-authored the book "Workbook on Cointegration" with Søren Johansen.

Selected writings
 Hansen, P.R., (2005), "Test for Superior Predictive Ability", Journal of Business and Economic Statistics.
 Hansen, P.R., A. Lunde (2006), "Realized Variance and Market Microstructure Noise”, Journal of Business and Economic Statistics. Vol. 24, pp. 127–218. (The 2005 Invited Address with Discussions and Rejoinder).
 Hansen, P.R., A. Lunde (2006), "Consistent Ranking of Volatility Models", Journal of Econometrics, Vol. 131, pp. 97–121.
 Barndorff-Nielsen, O.E., P.R. Hansen, A. Lunde, N. Shephard (2011), "Subsampled realised kernels", Journal of Econometrics, Vol. 160, Issue 1, January 2011, pp. 204–219
 Barndorff-Nielsen, O.E., P.R. Hansen, A. Lunde, N. Shephard (2008), "Designing realised kernels to measure the ex-post variation of equity prices in the presence of noise", Econometrica. Vol. 76, pp. 1481–1536.

References

External links
Peter R. Hansen at The Department of Economics at UNC Chapel Hill
The Henry A. Latané Distinguished Professorship in Economics
Peter Reinhard Hansen at Google Sites

1968 births
Living people
Danish economists
Econometricians
People from Sorø Municipality
Brown University faculty
Stanford University faculty
University of California, San Diego alumni
University of Copenhagen alumni